Catherine Foster may refer to:
 Catherine Foster (soprano), English operatic soprano
 Catherine Foster (murderer), English woman who murdered her husband
 Cathy Foster, British sailor
 Kitty Foster, freed African American woman, notable for having owned property